Erigeron acer is a widespread herbaceous flowering plant in the family Asteraceae. Common names include bitter fleabane and blue fleabane. The species is native to Canada, colder parts of the United States, northern, central, and southeastern Asia, and most of Europe.

Erigeron acer is a biennial or perennial herb up to 100 cm (40 inches) tall, producing a taproot and a woody rhizome. One plant can produce many small flower heads, each with pink, lilac, or occasionally white ray florets and yellow disc florets.

Subspecies:
 Erigeron acris subsp. droebachiensis (O.F.Müll.) Arcang. (synonym: Erigeron droebachiensis O.F.Müll.)

References

External links
Plants for a Future database

acer
Flora of Asia
Flora of Europe
Flora of North America
Plants described in 1753
Taxa named by Carl Linnaeus